Rampur is a village in Phillaur in Jalandhar district of Punjab State, India. The village is administrated by Sarpanch an elected representative of the village.

Demography 
, The village has a total number of 95 houses and the population of 443 of which 221 are males while 222 are females.  According to the report published by Census India in 2011, out of the total population of the village 161 people are from Schedule Caste and the village does not have any Schedule Tribe population so far.

See also
List of villages in India

References

External links 

 Tourism of Punjab
 Census of Punjab

Villages in Jalandhar district